Thomas Sandys, 2nd Baron Sandys, was an English peer.

The son of William Sandys, 1st Baron Sandys, Sandys succeeded his father and was summoned to Parliament in 1543.

Sandys married Elizabeth, daughter of George Manners, 11th Baron Ros. They had two sons:
 Henry Sandys, married Elizabeth, daughter of William Windsor, 2nd Baron Windsor, had three children:
 William Sandys
 Thomas Sandys
 Margery Sandys
 Sir Walter Sandys 

His older son Henry having died in his lifetime, Sandys was succeeded by his grandson William Sandys, 3rd Baron Sandys.

References

Thomas
16th-century English nobility